Gârbova is a commune located in Alba County, Transylvania, Romania. It has a population of 2,050 and is composed of three villages: Cărpiniș (Keppelsbach; Kerpenyes), Gârbova, and Reciu (Rätsch; Szebenrécse).

The commune is located in the southeastern part of the county, on the border with Sibiu County. The river Gârbova flows through the commune.

On a hill above Gârbova lie the ruins of a Romanesque basilica. Built in 1280, it served as a church until Christmas Day, 1870, when a fire destroyed the roof and damaged much of the structure.

References

Communes in Alba County
Localities in Transylvania